Susanino is an urban locality (an urban-type settlement) in Susaninsky District of Kostroma Oblast, Russia. Population:

References

Urban-type settlements in Kostroma Oblast
Susaninsky District
Buysky Uyezd